Finn Berstad (17 July 1901 — 1 October 1982) was a Norwegian footballer.

Club career
Berstad was a striker in his early career, but was later used as a central defender. Some remember Berstad for his penalty kick against Swedish team Djurgården in the summer of 1920 on Brann stadion, when he missed on a blank goal on purpose. He played for SK Brann, and won the Norwegian cup title in 1923 and 1925.

International career
In addition he played 32 matches and scored 13 goals for the Norway national football team.

External links
  National team appearances

References

1901 births
1982 deaths
Norwegian footballers
Norway international footballers
SK Brann players

Association football forwards
Association football defenders
Footballers from Bergen